Jacobabad District is a district in the province of Sindh, Pakistan.  It is located in the north of Sindh, by the provincial boundary with Balochistan. Its headquarters is the town of Jacobabad, which was founded by General John Jacob in 1847.

Administration
District Council Jacobabad have 44 Union councils, 2 Municipal Committees and 3 Town  Committees

The district is administratively subdivided into the following tehsil:

 Garhi Khairo Tehsil
 Jacobabad Tehsil
 Thul Tehsil

History 
During British India, the town was the administrative headquarters of the Upper Sindh Frontier District of the Bombay Presidency; with a station on the Quetta branch of the North-Western railway, 37 m. from the junction at Ruk, on the main line. It is famous as having consistently the highest temperature in Pakistan. During the month of June the thermometer ranges between 120° and 127 °F. The town was founded on the site of the village of Khangarh in 1847 by General John Jacob, for many years commandant of the Sind Horse, who died here in 1858, and left a marvellous Victoria Tower in his remembrance in the heart of the city. It has cantonments for a cavalry regiment, with accommodation for caravans from Central Asia. It is watered by two canals. An annual horse show is held in January.

The district has had its present name since 1952. For a brief period after 1961, it included the Nasirabad subdivision. In 2004 Kashmore District was formed from its eastern half.

Notable people

 Muhammad Mian Soomro, Pakistani Politician
 Saira Shahliani, Pakistani Politician
 Kiran Baluch, Pakistani Former Cricketer
 Aijaz Hussain Jakhrani, Pakistani Politician
 Muhammad Muqeem Khan Khoso, Pakistani Politician
 Ahmed Mian Soomro, Pakistani Politician
 Abdul Hafeez Shaikh, Pakistani economist and politician
 Elahi Bux Soomro, Pakistani Senior Politician

Demography 

At the time of the 2017 census, Jacobabad district had a population of 1,007,009, of which 297,218 (29.51%) lived in urban areas. Jacobabad had a sex ratio of 956 females per 1000 males and a literacy rate of 34.07%: 44.93% for males and 22.77% for females.

Islam is the predominant religion with 97.76% of the population while Hinduism is the minority religion, practiced by 2.16% of the population.

At the time of the 2017 census, 88.57% of the population spoke Sindhi, 5.23% Balochi, 3.26% Brahui and 1.33% Saraiki as their first language.

Airport and airbase
The Shahbaz Air Base (co-located with the commercial airport in Jacobabad) was one of the three Pakistani air bases used by U.S. and allied forces to support the Operation Enduring Freedom campaign in Afghanistan and drone strikes in the former Federally Administered Tribal Areas.

List of Dehs
The following is a list of Jacobabad District's dehs, organised by taluka:

 Jacobabad Tehsil (58 dehs)
 Abad
 Abdullah Dakhan
 Ahmedpur
 Akilpur
 Alipur
 Attai
 Bachal Pur
 Badal Wah
 Bajhani
 Baqapur
 Bello Alipur
 Bello Dixon
 Bhalidino
 Burj Selemi
 Chajjra
 Chawani
 Dadh
 Dadpur
 Dasti
 Detha
 Dilawarpur
 Fatehpur
 Garhi Chand
 Garhi Mehrab
 Ghouspur
 Hambhi
 Jacobabad
 Janidero
 Khairwah
 Khaloolabad
 Koureja
 Lal Lodro
 Malhooabad
 Mehar Shah
 Mehrabpur
 Milkiat Sarkar
 Moulabad
 Moulan Rato
 Mundranipur
 Nawara
 Nawazo
 Orangabad
 Phatanwah
 Pir Padhro
 Qadirpur
 Qaiasrabad
 Rahimabad
 Ramzanpur
 Retti
 Rindwahi
 Shahdadpur
 Shahpur
 Sheeradabad
 Soomanpur
 Thariri Bhalidino
 Umaranipur
 Wakro
 Waryamabad
 Thul Taluka (93 dehs)
 Abdullah Jakhrani
 Ali Khan
 Allagh Yar
 Athri
 Bachro
 Bahadurpur
 Bakhtiarpur
 Balochabad
 Bamble
 Barri
 Bhanger
 Bitti
 Bolaki
 Burira
 Chandan
 Channa
 Daho
 Dakhan
 Daro Mukh
 Deen Garh
 Dhani Bux
 Dil Murad
 Dool
 Dubi
 Fateh Khan Sabayo
 Ganji
 Garhi Hassan
 Garhi Rahimabad
 Ghulamoon
 Ghunia
 Girkano
 Gola
 Gujo
 Hairo
 Hambi
 Hotewah
 Hyderpur
 Jalal Pur
 Jariyoon
 Jhangiwah
 Joungal
 Kanrani
 Karim Abad
 Karim Bux
 Katta
 Khatan
 Khosa
 Khuda Bux
 Korar
 Kot Gul Muhammad
 Kot Jangu
 Lado
 Logi
 Loi
 Madad Khoso
 Maloi
 Mehar Ali
 Mehrabpur
 Miral Nau
 Miral Purano
 Mirpur
 Mirsipur
 Mitho Thariri
 Moosa Wah
 Mubarakpur
 Muhib Wah
 Nagan
 Nau Wah
 Odhano
 Pako
 Panah Abaad
 Phul
 Purano Wah
 Qalendarpur
 Rahim Abad
 Ranjhapur
 Rap Muard
 Rato Thariri
 Sajin Wah
 Sameja
 Sarki
 Sher Wah
 Shujra
 Tajo Khoso
 Talib Shah
 Tanwari
 Thariri
 Thul Nau
 Thul Purano
 Toj
 Udi
 Wah Mistri
 Zangipur
 Garhi Khairo Taluka (60 dehs)
 Abdullah Mahesar
 Allah Pur
 Allahabad
 Amir Abad
 Azmat Abad
 Baharo Khokhar
 Budho
 Daro Jeeand
 Datirdino Mahesar
 Dital Wah
 Doda Pur
 Drib Morayo
 Dunya Pur`
 Garhi Khairo
 Ghouse Abad
 Gokal Pur
 Gul Wah
 Hazar Wah
 Jafar Abad
 Jahan Pur
 Jalbani
 Jamal Abad
 Jeeand
 Khairo
 Khan Wah
 Khand
 Khanpur
 Khuda Abad
 Kitch
 Kohari
 Koor Beero
 Koor Khairo Gachal
 Koor Rato
 Kotari
 Kote Ali Nawaz
 Lal Odho
 Lal Wah
 Lund
 Mairee
 Miranpur
 Muarad Ali
 Muhammad Pur
 Nao Wah
 Nazimabad
 Pir Bux
 Punhoon Bhatti
 Qeemat Abad
 Rasol Abad
 Saleh
 Sawan Lashari
 Shah Bazi Mahar
 Shaheed
 Sher Khan
 Sheran Pur
 Sone Wah
 Sultanpur
 Tajo Dero
 Thariri
 Wah Ali Hyder
 Wasayo

References

Notes

Bibliography

See Also
 Garhi Khairo Tehsil
 Jacobabad Tehsil
 Thul Tehsil
 Jacobabad
 Thul
 Larkana Division

 
Districts of Sindh